Meruane is a surname of Palestinian origin.

People with the name
 Lina Meruane (born 1970), Chilean writer and professor
 Nelly Meruane (1927–2018), Chilean actress and teacher
  (born 1956), Chilean humorist

References

Surnames of Palestinian origin